Carol Hughes may refer to:
Carol Hughes (politician) (born 1958), Canadian politician
Carol Hughes (actress) (1910–1995), American actress
Carol Hughes (Hughes), widow of the English poet Ted Hughes (died 1998)
Carol Hughes (author) (born 1955 or 1961), British American children's writer
Carol Hughes (producer), producer of the 1993 Australian film Say a Little Prayer